A Wind-Beaten Tree is an oil painting created in August 1883 by Vincent van Gogh early in his artistic career, whilst he was living in The Hague. It was stolen from a private collection in Zurich in 1997 and has not been recovered.

See also
List of works by Vincent van Gogh
List of stolen paintings

External links

Paintings by Vincent van Gogh
1883 paintings
Stolen works of art